Feres v. United States, 340 U.S. 135 (1950), combined three pending federal cases for a hearing in certiorari in which the Supreme Court of the United States held that the United States is not liable under the Federal Tort Claims Act for injuries to members of the armed forces sustained while on active duty and not on furlough and resulting from the negligence of others in the armed forces. The opinion is an extension of the English common-law concept of sovereign immunity.

The practical effect is that the Feres doctrine effectively bars service members from collecting damages from the United States Government for personal injuries experienced in the performance of their duties.  It also bars families of service members from filing wrongful death or loss of consortium actions when a service member is killed or injured.  The bar does not extend to killed or injured family members, so a spouse or child may still sue the United States for tort claims, nor does it bar service members from filing either in loco parentis on their child's behalf or filing for wrongful death or loss of consortium as a companion claim to a spouse or child's suit.

There have been exceptions to the Feres doctrine where active duty members have been allowed to sue for injuries when the court found that civilians could have been harmed in the same manner under the same circumstances in which the service member's injuries occurred.

Injuries experienced by service members while on active duty are covered by various Department of Veterans Affairs benefits legislation.

The effect of the doctrine was substantially limited by a change in the law made by the National Defense Authorization Act for Fiscal Year 2020, which created an administrative process to hear claims of medical malpractice.

Facts 
Feres v. United States combined three cases pending in the federal courts: the Feres case, the Jefferson case and the Griggs case.

A common issue arising under the Federal Tort Claims Act, as to which Courts of Appeals are in conflict, makes it appropriate to consider three cases in one opinion.

The Feres case: The District Court dismissed an action by the executrix of Feres against the United States to recover for death caused by negligence. Decedent perished by fire in the barracks at Pine Camp, New York, while on active duty in service of the United States. Negligence was alleged in quartering him in barracks known or which should have been known to be unsafe because of a defective heating plant, and in failing to maintain an adequate fire watch. The Court of Appeals, Second Circuit, dismissed the case.

The Jefferson case: Plaintiff, while in the Army, was required to undergo an abdominal operation. About eight months later, in the course of another operation after plaintiff was discharged, a towel 30 inches long by 18 inches wide, marked "Medical Department U.S. Army," was discovered and removed from his stomach. The complaint alleged that it was negligently left there by the army surgeon. The District Court, being doubtful of the law, refused without prejudice the Government's pretrial motion to dismiss the complaint.  After trial, finding negligence as a fact, Judge Chesnut carefully reexamined the issue of law and concluded that the Act does not charge the United States with liability in this type of case.  The Court of Appeals, Fourth Circuit, affirmed dismissal of the case.

The Griggs case: The District Court dismissed the complaint of Griggs' executrix, which alleged that while on active duty he met death because of negligent and unskillful medical treatment by army surgeons. The Court of Appeals, Tenth Circuit, reversed and, one judge dissenting, held that the complaint stated a cause of action under the Act.

The case was heard by the United States Supreme Court in certiorari.

Issues 
Does the Federal Tort Claim Act (FTCA), construed to fit, so far as will comport with its words into the entire statutory system of remedies against the Government?
Was the purpose of Federal Tort Claims Act to transfer from Congress to the courts the burden of examining tort claims?
The Act confers on the district courts broad jurisdiction, but does this apply to any claim recognizable at law?
Does FTCA create a new cause of tort action?
Is the Government in a position of being analogous to the liability of a "private individual" growing out of "like circumstances"?
Does the "act or omission" resulting in negligence and liability apply in the relationship of the Government to members of its armed forces?
Does FTCA provide a remedial adjustment for other established systems of compensation for injuries and death in the armed services?
Is the ruling in the Feres case, dismissing the cause of action at the District Court level correct?
Is the dismissal of the Jefferson case at the District Court and affirmed by the Court of Appeals, Fourth Circuit correct?
Is the cause of action under FTCA as affirmed by the Court of Appeals, Tenth Circuit, in the Griggs case correct?
How are the rulings in Brooks v. United States to be distinguished?

Held
The United States is not liable under the Federal Tort Claims Act for injuries to members of the armed forces sustained while on active duty and not on furlough and resulting from the negligence of others in the armed forces.		
The Tort Claims Act should be construed to fit, so far as will comport with its words, into the entire statutory system of remedies against the Government to make a workable, consistent, and equitable whole.
One of the purposes of the Act was to transfer from Congress to the courts the burden of examining tort claims against the Government, and Congress was not burdened with private bills on behalf of military and naval personnel, because a comprehensive system of relief had been authorized by statute for them and their dependents.
The Act confers on the district courts broad jurisdiction over "civil actions on claims against the United States, for money damages," but it remains for the courts to determine whether any claim is recognizable in law.
It does not create new causes of action, but merely accepts for the Government liability under circumstances that would bring private liability into existence.
There is no analogous liability of a "private individual" growing out of "like circumstances" when the relationship of the wronged to the wrongdoers in these cases is considered.
The provision of the Act making "the law of the place where the act or omission occurred" govern any consequent liability is inconsistent with an intention to make the Government liable in the circumstances of these cases, since the relationship of the Government and members of its armed forces is "distinctively federal in character."
The failure of the Act to provide for any adjustment between the remedy provided therein and other established systems of compensation for injuries or death of those in the armed services is persuasive that the Tort Claims Act was not intended to be applicable in the circumstances of these cases.
Brooks v. United States, distinguished.
The dismissal of Feres by the District Court is affirmed.
The dismissal of Jefferson by the Fourth Circuit is affirmed.
The reinstatement of Griggs by the Tenth Circuit is reversed.

Opinion
The Opinion of the Court was rendered by the Honorable Justice Robert Jackson.

The common fact underlying the three cases is that each claimant, while on active duty and not on furlough, sustained injury due to negligence of others in the armed forces. The only issue of law raised is whether the Tort Claims Act extends its remedy to one sustaining "incident to the service" what under other circumstances would be an actionable wrong. This is the "wholly different case" reserved from our decision in Brooks v. United States.
		
There are few guiding materials for our task of statutory construction. No committee reports or floor debates disclose what effect the statute was designed to have on the problem before us, or that it even was in mind. Under these circumstances, no conclusion can be above challenge, but if we misinterpret the Act, at least Congress possesses a ready remedy. 
We do not overlook considerations persuasive of liability in these cases. The Act does confer district court jurisdiction generally over claims for money damages against the United States founded on negligence. It does contemplate that the Government will sometimes respond for negligence of military personnel, for it defines "employee of the Government" to include "members of the military or naval forces of the United States," and provides that " `acting within the scope of his office or employment', in the case of a member of the military or naval forces of the United States, means acting in line of duty." Its exceptions might also imply inclusion of claims such as we have here. [The statute] excepts "any claim arising out of the combatant activities of the military or naval forces, or the Coast Guard, during time of war", from which it is said we should infer allowance of claims arising from noncombat activities in peace. Section 2680 (k) excludes "any claim arising in a foreign country." Significance also has been attributed in these cases, as in the Brooks case, to the fact that eighteen tort claims bills were introduced in Congress between 1925 and 1935 and all but two expressly denied recovery to members of the armed forces; but the bill enacted as the present Tort Claims Act from its introduction made no exception. We also are reminded that the Brooks case, in spite of its reservation of service-connected injuries, interprets the Act to cover claims not incidental to service, and it is argued that much of its reasoning is as apt to impose liability in favor of a man on duty as in favor of one on leave. These considerations, it is said, should persuade us to cast upon Congress, as author of the confusion, the task of qualifying and clarifying its language if the liability here asserted should prove so depleting of the public treasury as the Government fears.

This Act, however, should be construed to fit, so far as will comport with its words, into the entire statutory system of remedies against the Government to make a workable, consistent and equitable whole. The Tort Claims Act was not an isolated and spontaneous flash of congressional generosity. It marks the culmination of a long effort to mitigate unjust consequences of sovereign immunity from suit. While the political theory that the King could do no wrong was repudiated in America, a legal doctrine derived from it that the Crown is immune from any suit to which it has not consented was invoked on behalf of the Republic and applied by our courts as vigorously as it had been on behalf of the Crown. As the Federal Government expanded its activities, its agents caused a multiplying number of remediless wrongs—wrongs which would have been actionable if inflicted by an individual or a corporation but remediless  solely because their perpetrator was an officer or employee of the Government. Relief was often sought and sometimes granted through private bills in Congress, the number of which steadily increased as Government activity increased. The volume of these private bills, the inadequacy of congressional machinery for determination of facts, the importunities to which claimants subjected members of Congress, and the capricious results, led to a strong demand that claims for tort wrongs be submitted to adjudication. Congress already had waived immunity and made the Government answerable for breaches of its contracts and certain other types of claims.   At last, in connection with the Reorganization Act, it waived immunity and transferred the burden of examining tort claims to the courts. The primary purpose of the Act was to extend a remedy to those who had been without; if it incidentally benefited those already well provided for, it appears to have been unintentional. Congress was suffering from no plague of private bills on the behalf of military and naval personnel, because a comprehensive system of relief had been authorized for them and their dependents by statute.

Looking to the detail of the Act, it is true that it provides, broadly, that the District Court "shall have exclusive jurisdiction of civil actions on claims against the United States, for money damages . . . ."This confers jurisdiction to render judgment upon all such claims.  But it does not say that all claims must be allowed. Jurisdiction is necessary to deny a claim on its merits as matter of law as much as to adjudge that liability exists. We interpret this language to mean all its says, but no more. Jurisdiction of the defendant now exists where the defendant was immune from suit before; it remains for courts, in exercise of their jurisdiction, to determine whether any claim is recognizable in law.

For this purpose, the Act goes on to prescribe the test of allowable claims, which is, "The United States shall be liable . . . in the same manner and to the same extent as a private individual under like circumstances. . .," with certain exceptions not material here.  It will be seen that this is not the creation of new causes of action but acceptance of liability under circumstances that would bring private liability into existence. This, we think, embodies the same idea that its English equivalent enacted in 1947  expressed, "Where any person has a claim against the Crown after the commencement of this Act, and, if this Act had not been passed, the claim might have been enforced, subject to the grant . . ." of consent to be sued, the claim may now be enforced without specific consent. One obvious shortcoming in these claims is that plaintiffs can point to no liability of a "private individual" even remotely analogous to that which they are asserting against the United States. We know of no American law which ever has permitted a soldier to recover for negligence, against either his superior officers or the Government he is serving.   Nor is there any liability "under like circumstances," for no private individual has power to conscript or mobilize a private army with such authorities over persons as the Government vests in echelons of command. The nearest parallel, even if we were to treat "private individual" as including a state, would be the relationship between the states and their militia. But if we indulge plaintiffs the benefit of this comparison, claimants cite us no state, and we know of none, which has permitted members of its militia to maintain tort actions for injuries suffered in the service, and in at least one state the contrary has been held to be the case.  It is true that if we consider relevant only a part of the circumstances and ignore the status of both the wronged and the wrongdoer in these cases we find analogous private liability. In the usual civilian doctor and patient relationship, there is of course a liability for malpractice. And a landlord would undoubtedly be held liable if an injury occurred to a tenant as the result of a negligently maintained heating plant. But the liability assumed by the Government here is that created by "all the circumstances," not that which a few of the circumstances might create. We find no parallel liability before, and we think no new one has been created by, this Act. Its effect is to waive immunity from recognized causes of action and was not to visit the Government with novel and unprecedented liabilities.	
The relationship between the Government and members of its armed forces is "distinctively federal in character," as this Court recognized in United States v. Standard Oil Co.,  wherein the Government unsuccessfully sought to recover for losses incurred by virtue of injuries to a soldier.

No federal law recognizes a recovery such as claimants seek. The Military Personnel Claims Act, permitted recovery in some circumstances, but it specifically excluded claims of military personnel "incident to their service."

This Court, in deciding claims for wrongs incident to service under the Tort Claims Act, cannot escape attributing some bearing upon it to enactments by Congress which provide systems of simple, certain, and uniform compensation for injuries or death of those in armed services.[12] We might say that the claimant may (a) enjoy both types of recovery, or (b) elect which to pursue, thereby waiving the other, or (c) pursue both, crediting the larger liability with the proceeds of the smaller, or (d) that the compensation and pension remedy excludes the tort remedy. There is as much statutory authority for one as for another of these conclusions. If Congress had contemplated that this Tort Act would be held to apply in cases of this kind, it is difficult to see why it should have omitted any provision to adjust these two types of remedy to each other. The absence of any such adjustment is persuasive that there was no awareness that the Act might be interpreted to permit recovery for injuries incident to military service. 

A soldier is at peculiar disadvantage in litigation. Lack of time and money, the difficulty if not impossibility of procuring witnesses, are only a few of the factors working to his disadvantage. And the few cases charging superior officers or the Government with neglect or misconduct which have been brought since the Tort Claims Act, of which the present are typical, have either been suits by widows or surviving dependents, or have been brought after the individual was discharged. The compensation system, which normally requires no litigation, is not negligible or niggardly, as these cases demonstrate. The recoveries compare extremely favorably with those provided by most workmen's compensation statutes. In the Jefferson case, the District Court considered actual and prospective payments by the Veterans' Administration as diminution of the verdict. Plaintiff received $3,645.50 to the date of the court's computation and on estimated life expectancy under existing legislation would prospectively receive $31,947 in addition. In the Griggs case, the widow, in the two-year period after her husband's death, received payments in excess of $2,100. In addition, she received $2,695, representing the six months' death gratuity under the Act of December 17, 1919, as amended, 41 Stat. 367, 57 Stat. 599, 10 U. S. C. § 903. It is estimated that her total future pension payments will aggregate $18,000. Thus the widow will receive an amount in excess of $22,000 from Government gratuities, whereas she sought and could seek under state law only $15,000, the maximum permitted by Illinois for death.

It is contended that all these considerations were before the Court in the Brooks case and that allowance of recovery to Brooks requires a similar holding of liability here. The actual holding in the Brooks case can support liability here only by ignoring the vital distinction there stated. The injury to Brooks did not arise out of or in the course of military duty. Brooks was on furlough, driving along the highway, under compulsion of no orders or duty and on no military mission. A government owned and operated vehicle collided with him. Brooks' father, riding in the same car, recovered for his injuries and the Government did not further contest the judgment but contended that there could be no liability to the sons, solely because they were in the Army. This Court rejected the contention, primarily because Brooks' relationship while on leave was not analogous to that of a soldier injured while performing duties under orders.
We conclude that the Government is not liable under the Federal Tort Claims Act for injuries to servicemen where the injuries arise out of or are in the course of activity incident to service. Without exception, the relationship of military personnel to the Government has been governed exclusively by federal law. We do not think that Congress, in drafting this Act, created a new cause of action dependent on local law for service-connected injuries or death due to negligence. We cannot impute to Congress such a radical departure from established law in the absence of express congressional command. Accordingly, the judgments in the Feres and Jefferson cases are affirmed and that in the Griggs case is reversed.

MR. JUSTICE DOUGLAS concurs in the result.

Discussion

A clarifying discussion of the Feres Doctrine was written in the decision of Martinelli v. United States Department of the Army, 1987.

OPINION OF THE COURT
I.

Appellant Rose Martinelli appeals from the district court dismissal of her Federal Tort Claims Act (FTCA) suit against the United States for 
damages for the death of her son allegedly caused by injuries received while serving as a member of the United States Army Reserves. The district court held that suit was barred as a matter of law because of the doctrine expressed in Feres v. United States, that military servicemen may not sue the United States government under the FTCA for injuries arising during service in the military. This court has not previously considered the application of the Feres doctrine to military reservists. Our review over this issue is plenary.

II.

In Feres, the Court gave several reasons for its preclusion of an FTCA suit alleging that negligence caused the death of a serviceman trapped in a barracks during a fire while on active duty. The Court referred to the availability of assured compensation, stating that because injured servicepersons may seek recovery under the Veterans' Benefits Act,  a remedy under the FTCA is unnecessary.  Martinelli argues that military reservists are different because no such relief is available to them. However, as the government points out, there is provision for such coverage because under the Veterans' Benefits Act reserve duty is expressly encompassed within "inactive duty training",  and the statutory definition of veteran includes one who became disabled or died during a period of "inactive duty training".

The Feres Court also noted that the FTCA imposed liability on the government only "in the same manner and to the same extent as a private individual under such circumstances."  The Court stated that there is no liability in the private sphere analogous to that asserted against the United States by or on behalf of a serviceman injured while on military duty.   Based on this rationale, later cases have held that the Feres doctrine is based primarily on the effect of lawsuits on military effectiveness. Thus, in United States v. Brown  the Court stated that the Feres doctrine was based on the "peculiar and special relationship of the soldier to his superiors, the effects of the maintenance of such suits on discipline, and the extreme results that might obtain if suits under the Tort Claims Act were allowed for negligent orders given or negligent acts committed in the course of military duty." More recently, in United States v. Shearer,  the Court again stated that the important focus in considering the applicability of the Feres doctrine is "whether the suit requires the civilian court to second guess military decisions."

The allegation of Martinelli's complaint, which we must accept as true in the procedural posture of this case, is that Martinelli's son died as a result of exposure to noxious gases during his participation as a civilian reserve member in gas chamber exercises. Martinelli alleges the exercises were conducted negligently, carelessly and recklessly. In Jaffee v. United States  this court held that Feres precluded recovery by a serviceman who developed cancer after what the complaint claimed was intentional exposure to radiation during a military exercise. Judge Higginbotham, writing for the majority, stated that suits for service injuries are prohibited because of "their effect on the willingness of military personnel to follow directions of their superiors" and because "[m]ilitary decisionmakers might not be willing to act as quickly and forcefully as is necessary ... if they know they will subsequently be called into a civilian court to answer for their actions." The rationale used by this court in Jaffee is equally applicable to Martinelli. Suits by reservists, albeit civilian, for injuries received while on reserve training in military exercises would have the same consequences.

Accordingly, we hold that the Feres doctrine bars FTCA suits by or on behalf of persons serving in the United States Military Reserves because the same rationale that precludes suits by or on behalf of servicepersons is equally applicable to reservists. Our decision is in accord with that of several other courts of appeals that have addressed the issue.

Martinelli argues that we should engage in a case-by-case review to ascertain if application of Feres is appropriate. However, in Jorden v. National Guard  we rejected the argument that Feres requires us to inquire in each case whether judicial review will unduly interfere with military operations. Instead, we reaffirmed our view, held as well by the majority of courts, that Feres is a per se bar of damage actions against the United States and military officers arising out of injuries to military personnel.

In rejecting plaintiff's appeal, we feel compelled to point out that attempts by members of this court to limit the Feres doctrine have been consistently unsuccessful. The panel opinion in Jaffee that would have held that Feres does not grant absolute immunity to military and civilian defendants when charged with intentional, unauthorized tortious conduct, This court's opinion that the survivor of an off-duty serviceman could recover from the government for its negligent failure to prevent his murder by another off-duty serviceman was reversed by the Supreme Court in United States v. Shearer It is therefore evident that any relaxation in the Feres doctrine must come from Congress.

For the foregoing reasons, we will affirm the order dismissing the complaint.

Challenges to the Feres Doctrine

Miller v. United States 
In Miller v. United States, the 5th Circuit Court of Appeals applied the doctrine to a fourth class Midshipman at the United States Naval Academy. Leonce J. Miller, III brought suit against the United States government after he was knocked overboard and unconscious by the boom of the sailboat he was navigating due to improper training and inclement weather. Miller sustained further damage when he was unable to be immediately rescued because the U.S. Navy's boat overseeing the exercise was inoperable and those assigned to watch the trainees were working on the boat. Subsequent to the accident, Miller was admitted to the National Naval Medical Center in Bethesda, Maryland, where he was told he had no physiological injuries, only to learn subsequently that he had suffered a fractured neck and vestibular nerve damage. For nearly four years, Miller was unable to walk unassisted. The Court personally addressed Miller, stating:

Witt v. United States 
In Witt v. United States, a plaintiff before the United States District Court for the Eastern District of California unsuccessfully argued that the Feres Doctrine violated the equal protection clauses of the Fifth and Fourteenth Amendments. In October 2003, Airman SSGT. Dean P. Witt was admitted to David Grant Medical Center for a routine appendectomy while he was on approved furlough to finalize his transfer from Hill Air Force Base, Utah to Travis Air Force Base, California. Prior to post-op, and shortly following surgery, a military nurse anesthetist re-inserted an endotracheal tube into his esophagus instead of his trachea, forcing life-saving oxygen to be pumped into his stomach, instead of his lungs, and then utilized a pediatric medical device to try and save him, resulting in an anoxic brain injury that left him in a vegetative state. Witt died 3 months later on January 9, 2004.

Witt's wife filed a wrongful death claim in August 2008 under Federal Tort Claims Act in California's Eastern (9th) Circuit District, which was reluctantly denied by District Judge John Mendez in February 2009. Mendez urged the Supreme Court to revisit the Feres Doctrine because the Feres Doctrine was “unfair” and “irrational.”

In May 2010, Witt's wife appealed the Ninth Circuit's decision and in January 2011, Witt's wife filed for petition for writ of certiorari. In February 2011, amicus briefs were filed in support of Witt's appeal. However, the Supreme Court refused to hear the case and the petition for certiorari was denied on June 27, 2011.

Other challenges 
In March 2009, Representative Maurice Hinchey of New York's 22nd congressional district introduced the Carmelo Rodriguez Military Medical Accountability Act of 2009, an amended version of a bill from 2008. In 2010, Hinchey re-introduced the amended bill in the House of Representatives. The bill would have amended the Federal Torts Claims Act to allow claims for military members who are injured or killed due to negligent and wrongful acts in healthcare, except during military conflict from those who are employed by the U.S. Government; it did not pass.

In 2021, the Supreme Court denied Certiorari in Jane Doe v. United States (3 May, 2021). This case concerned an unnamed plaintiff who was allegedly raped by a fellow cadet during her second year at West Point University. After exhausting administrative proceedings, Jane Doe sued the government by invoking the Federal Torts Claims Act, but was dismissed by the district court under the Feres Doctrine. After an appeals court affirmed the dismissal of the lower court, Jane Doe asked the Supreme Court to overrule the Feres Doctrine, but the petition was denied. Justice Clarence Thomas dissented, criticizing the doctrine and the Courts unwillingness to overrule wrongly decided cases:

“Perhaps the Court is hesitant to take up this issue at all because it would require fiddling with a 70-year old precedent that is demonstrably wrong. But if the Feres doctrine is so wrong that that we cannot figure out how to rein it in, then the better answer is to bid it farewell. There is precedent for that approach. We should follow it.” Justice Clarance Thomas dissenting (Pg. 3, 593 U.S _ 2021)

In 2019, Sergeant First Class Richard Stayskal, who was diagnosed with terminal lung cancer after military doctors noticed but failed to look into a growth in his lung on two separate occasions, testified before Congress about his ordeal. The result was the SFC Richard Stayskal Military Medical Accountability Act of 2019, signed into law by President Donald Trump on December 20 of that year, which created an administrative process for the filing and resolution of medical malpractice claims.

See also 
List of United States Supreme Court cases, volume 340

References

External links

 

1950 in United States case law
United States Constitution Article Three case law
United States federal sovereign immunity case law
United States military case law
United States Supreme Court cases of the Vinson Court
United States Supreme Court cases